The Myanmar Historical Commission (formerly, the Burma Historical Commission) is an academic research organization focused on Burma studies. The commission was founded in 1955 by the Burmese government to produce an official version of national history. It regularly publishes the Bulletin of the Myanmar Historical Commission, and holds conferences in the country. As of 2009, the Commission had published six volumes of modern Burmese history from 1947 onward.

See also
 Burma Research Society
 Royal Historical Commission of Burma

References

Bibliography
 
 

History of Myanmar
Burma studies